"Goutte d'eau" is a song by Ninho released. It was released on 23 February 2019 and peaked at number-one on the French Singles Chart. The song peaked at number three in Belgium. The name refers to 'drops of gold' in heraldry.

Charts

Weekly charts

Year-end charts

Certifications

References 

2019 singles
2019 songs
French-language songs
Ninho songs
number-one singles in France